The Turnverein Jahn Hiesfeld e.V. is a German sports club in Dinslaken.

In addition to association football, handball, hockey, tennis, athletics, swimming, volleyball, and taekwondo, various recreational sports and gymnastics courses are also offered.

History
TV Jahn Hiesfeld was founded on 14 October 1906, but it was only in 1945 when it created the football department. The club is so far one of the largest in the Lower Rhine.

The club currently plays in the tier five Oberliga Niederrhein.

Honours
The club's honours:
 Lower Rhine Cup
 Runners-up: 2014

Former players
 Wolfgang de Beer, former West German U-21 international, former goalkeeping coach of Borussia Dortmund
 Serkan Çalik, later played for Gençlerbirliği

Former coaches
 Christian Schreier (2010–2011)

External links
Main website of the association
Football department
Handball department

Association football clubs established in 1945
Football clubs in Germany
Football clubs in North Rhine-Westphalia
Sports clubs established in 1906
1906 establishments in Germany